Wignall may refer to:

People
Anne Wignall (1912–1982), English socialite and author
Frank George Wignall Pogson married into Doria-Pamphili-Landi, a princely Roman family of Genoese extraction
Frank Wignall (born 1939), retired English international footballer
Harrison James Wignall or Harrison Slater, American writer, pianist, and educator
James Wignall (1856–1925), M.P. for Forest of Dean
Judita Wignall, founder of Halo Friendlies, an all girl pop-punk band from Long Beach, CA
Maurice Wignall (born 1976), Jamaican hurdling athlete
Ruth Wignall (née Dodsworth), Welsh television presenter for ITV Wales
Steve Wignall (born 1954), English former professional football manager and player
Trevor Wignall (1881–1958), Welsh author and sportswriter

Geography
Wignall Nunataks, two snow-covered nunataks northwest of Mount Starlight in the Athos Range, Prince Charles Mountains, Antarctica
Wignall Peak, small peak just west of Mount McCarthy in the eastern part of the Porthos Range, Prince Charles Mountains, Antarctica